Seventh Fleet is a 1985 computer wargame published by Simulations Canada.

Gameplay
Seventh Fleet is a computer wargame that simulates the invasion of Vietnam by China. It features elements of board wargaming, such as counters and a physical map, combined with computer play.

Publication history
Seventh Fleet was released by Simulations Canada for the Commodore 64, Apple II, Atari ST and IBM PC.

Reception

Ed Curtis reviewed the game for Computer Gaming World, and stated that "SF is the best simulation of operational level naval warfare currently available. My only doubt concerns its longevity."

In a 1989 survey of computer wargames, J. L. Miller of Computer Play offered Seventh Fleet a positive assessment, noting that it offered "minimal graphics but good play value".

References

External links

Article in Commodore Magazine

1985 video games
Apple II games
Cold War video games
Commodore 64 games
Computer wargames
Naval video games
Simulations Canada video games
Turn-based strategy video games
Video games developed in Canada